Saint-David is a municipality in the Pierre-De Saurel Regional County Municipality, in the Montérégie region of Quebec. The population as of the Canada 2011 Census was 832.

Demographics

See also
List of municipalities in Quebec

References

Incorporated places in Pierre-De Saurel Regional County Municipality
Municipalities in Quebec